William Leopold Hoffer (November 8, 1870 – July 21, 1959) was a professional baseball player.  He was a right-handed pitcher over parts of six seasons (1895–1899, 1901) with the Baltimore Orioles, Pittsburgh Pirates and Cleveland Blues.  For his career, he compiled a 92–46 record in 161 appearances, with a 3.75 earned run average and 314 strikeouts. In 1901 he archived the dubious honor of being the losing pitcher in the American League's first game.

In his rookie year, 1895, he compiled 31 wins (including a league-leading four shutouts) for the League-winning Orioles.  He led the National League in Winning Percentage in 1895 and 1896.

He was born and later died in Cedar Rapids, Iowa, at the age of 88.

See also
 List of Major League Baseball annual saves leaders

References

External links

1870 births
1959 deaths
Major League Baseball pitchers
Baseball players from Iowa
Baltimore Orioles (NL) players
Cleveland Blues (1901) players
Pittsburgh Pirates players
Minor league baseball managers
Cedar Rapids Canaries players
Joliet Convicts players
Toledo Black Pirates players
Marinette Badgers players
Nashville Tigers players
Buffalo Bisons (minor league) players
Sacramento Senators players
Cleveland Lake Shores players
Des Moines Midgets players
Des Moines Prohibitionists players
Des Moines Undertakers players
Oklahoma City Mets players
Cedar Rapids Rabbits players
19th-century baseball players